Obed is an unincorporated community in west-central Alberta, Canada within Yellowhead County. It lies 50 km west of Edson via the Yellowhead Highway.

Obed Lake and Obed Lake Provincial Park are located immediately east of the community.

Demographics 

See also 
List of communities in Alberta
List of designated places in Alberta

References 

Designated places in Alberta
Localities in Yellowhead County